The Texas Longhorns football program is a college football team that represents the University of Texas at Austin of the Big 12 Conference in the National Collegiate Athletic Association. The team has had 28 head coaches since it started playing organized football in 1893 with the nickname Longhorns, although they played without a head coach in their first season. Texas was an original member of the Southwest Conference, joining in 1915. The Longhorns became a charter member of the Big 12 in 1996 when the Southwest Conference disbanded. The Longhorns have played in 1,200 games during their 117 seasons.  In those seasons, 10 coaches have led Texas to postseason bowl games: Dana X. Bible, Blair Cherry, Ed Price, Darrell Royal, Fred Akers, David McWilliams, John Mackovic, Mack Brown, Charlie Strong, Tom Herman, and Steve Sarkisian.

Ten coaches have won conference championships with the Longhorns: Berry Whitaker, Clyde Littlefield, Bible, Cherry, Price, Royal, Akers, McWilliams, Mackovic, and Brown. Royal and Brown have also won national championships with Texas.

Royal is the all-time leader in games coached (219), years coached (20) and total wins (167). Frank Crawford has the highest winning percentage of any Longhorn coach after going 5–0 his only year. Of coaches who served more than one season, Whitaker leads with a .865 winning percentage. Charlie Strong trails with a .455 winning percentage. Of the 28 Longhorns coaches, Bible, Royal, and Brown have been inducted into the College Football Hall of Fame. Royal and Brown have each received National Coach of the Year honors from at least one organization. The current head coach of the Longhorns is Steve Sarkisian.

Key

Coaches

Notes

References
General

Specific

Texas
Texas Longhorns football coaches
Austin, Texas-related lists